The Ministry of State Owned Enterprises (Indonesian: Kementerian Badan Usaha Milik Negara) is a ministry that oversee the development of state-owned enterprises in Indonesia. The ministry is headed by a Minister of State Owned Enterprises, who is accountable to President.

History
The Ministry of State Owned Enterprises can be traced back to the Department of Finance. The Ministry of State Owned Enterprises was in the Second Echelon of the Department of Finance from 1973 to 1993, before being elevated into the First Echelon in 1993. In 1998, the Department of State Owned Enterprises was created, however, it was regulated under the Department of Finance in its First Echelon from 2000 to 2001. In 2001, the Department of State Owned Enterprises was renamed the Ministry of State Owned Enterprises.

In 1998, this unit was promoted into a department and headed by a minister-rank official .

List of Ministers

Organisation
Ministry of State Owned Enterprises is organised as 2 vice ministers, one secretariat, 3 deputies and 3 expert staffs.
 Vice Minister I
 Vice Minister II
 Ministry Secretariat
 Deputy of Laws and Regulations
 Deputy of Human Resource, Technology, and Information
 Deputy of Finance and Risk Management
 Expert Staff of Strategic Policy Implementation
 Expert Staff of Industry
 Expert Staff of Finance and Micro Small and Medium Enterprise Development

Gallery

References

See also

 List of State-owned Enterprises in Indonesia

State Owned Enterprises
Government agencies established in 1998
1998 establishments in Indonesia